Wardell Gilbreath (born August 29, 1954) is an American retired sprinter.

References

1954 births
Living people
American male sprinters
Place of birth missing (living people)
African-American male track and field athletes
Universiade medalists in athletics (track and field)
Universiade gold medalists for the United States
Medalists at the 1973 Summer Universiade
21st-century African-American people
20th-century African-American sportspeople